The 2018–19 BLNO is the 19th season of the Basketball League of Norway since its establishment. It started on 22 September 2018.

Kongsberg Miners are the defending champions.

Format
The ten participating teams first played the regular season, that consisted in a round-robin schedule containing three rounds with every team playing each opponent at least once home and once away for a total of 27 matches.

At the end of the regular season, the top eight teams qualified for the playoffs.

Teams

Regular season

Standings

Results

Playoffs
Playoffs were played in a best-of-three games format.

Bracket

Quarter-finals

|}

Semi-finals

|}

Finals

|}

Norwegian clubs in European competitions
Norwegian clubs came back to European competitions sixteen years after their last participation.

References

External links
Official Norwegian Basketball Federation website

BLNO
Norway
Basketball
Basketball